Halt's Peril is the ninth book in the international best-selling Ranger's Apprentice series by John Flanagan. It was released on 2 November 2009 in Australia.

Plot
Halt, Will, and Horace discover that Tennyson, the leader of a fake religious cult called the Outsiders, and his followers have fled to Picta, a country to the north of Araluen and home of the Scotti, with the assistance of a smuggler named Black O'Malley. The three follow their trail and discover that Tennyson is heading toward Araluen. Tennyson's plan is to travel to an outlying Araluen village where he has already established influence to reinvigorate his movement. The trio continue to follow Tennyson through Picta and foil some Scotti raiders along the way. As the three catch up to Tennyson, they engage with the remaining two of his hired Genovesan assassins. Halt and Will manage to kill one, but the other injures Halt and escapes uninjured.

After a while, the wound is discovered to be poisoned by a hallucinogen which is slowly killing Halt. In desperation Will decides to seek the healer Malcolm and brings him to help. Malcolm explains that the poison has two possible sources with conflicting cures, and that administering the wrong cure will kill Halt. Will and Horace realise that the remaining assassin has been returning frequently to check on Halt's condition, and formulate a plan to capture him and force him to identify the poison by piercing him with his own arrow and promising the antidote if he tells them the origin poison. After being cured alongside Halt, the assassin attempts to escape but is killed by Will.

With Halt healthy once more, the group, now with Malcolm accompanying them, continue to trail Tennyson. They find Tennyson in catacombs near a village where he is preaching to the followers of his religion. Halt successfully discredits him with Malcolm's help. Halt tells all Araluens to leave before Will uses some dirt-bombs to cause the room to shake. In the chaos that follows, the cave system collapses on top of Tennyson, many of the Outsiders and all their gold. Halt, Will and Horace and Malcolm escape, and escort Malcolm back to his home in Grimsdell Wood. Once there, Will's friend Trobar gives Will a puppy, Ebony, the daughter of the dog Shadow which Will gave to Trobar in The Siege of Macindaw. After separating from Malcolm, the trio head home, with Will and Halt going to Redmont and reuniting with Pauline and Alyss while Horace heads to Castle Araluen.

External links 
 Halt's Peril at Random House Australia
 Halt's Peril at Random House NZ
 Official Ranger's Apprentice website
 John Flanagan's  Ranger's Apprentice website.

Ranger's Apprentice books
2009 Australian novels